Fast attack may refer to:

 Attack submarine
 Fast attack craft